Mohamed Kalil Traoré (born 9 July 2000) is a Guinean professional footballer who plays as a defender for the Guinea national team.

Club career

Early career 
Traoré grew up and played in Guinean top flight club Kamsar.

Hapoel Tel Aviv 
On 13 July 2021, Traoré joined Israeli Premier League club Hapoel Tel Aviv on a five-year contract, following a successful pre-season trial. He made his league debut in Israel on 28 August 2021.

International career
Traoré made his debut with the Guinea national team in a 3–0 2020 African Nations Championship win over Namibia on 19 January 2021.

External links

References

2000 births
Living people
Guinean footballers
Association football defenders
Guinea international footballers
CI Kamsar players
Hapoel Tel Aviv F.C. players
PFC Lokomotiv Plovdiv players
Guinée Championnat National players
Israeli Premier League players
Guinean expatriate footballers
Expatriate footballers in Israel
Expatriate footballers in Bulgaria
Guinean expatriate sportspeople in Israel
Guinean expatriate sportspeople in Bulgaria